In NMR spectroscopy, the product operator formalism is a method used to determine the outcome of pulse sequences in a rigorous but straightforward way. With this method it is possible to predict how the bulk magnetization evolves with time under the action of pulses applied in different directions. It is a net improvement from the semi-classical vector model which is not able to predict many of the results in NMR spectroscopy and is a simplification of the complete density matrix formalism.

Many other, non-classical operators exist for coupled systems.

Since every spin will evolve differently depending on its shift, with this formalism it is possible to calculate exactly where the magnetization will end up and hence devise pulse sequences to measure the desired signal while excluding others.

The product operator formalism is particularly useful in describing experiments in two-dimensions like COSY, HSQC and HMBC.

Motivation for sets of spin-1/2 particles 
Throughout this section, the reduced Planck constant  for convenience.

The product operator formalism is usually applied to sets of spin-1/2 particles, since the fact that the individual operators satisfy , where  is the identity operator, makes the commutation relations of product operators particularly simple. In principle the formalism could be extended to higher spins, but in practice the general irreducible spherical tensor treatment is more often used. As such, we consider only the spin-1/2 case below.

The main idea of the formalism is to make it easier to follow the system density operator , which evolves under a Hamiltonian  according to the Liouville-von Neumann equation as

For a time-independent Hamiltonian, the density operator inherits its solutions from the Schrödinger time-evolution operator  as

Density operator-state duality 
Similarly .

where  is the identity operator. Similarly, the density operator for the state  is

Additionally those parts do not evolve in time, since they trivially commute with the Hamiltonian. Therefore those terms can be ignored, and the state  corresponds to a density operator , while the state  corresponds to a density operator . In exactly the same manner, polarisation along the positive x-axis, that is a state , corresponds to a density operator . This idea extends naturally to multiple spins, where the states and operators are direct products of single-spin states and operators. Hence operator terms in the density operator have a direct duality with states.

In the case of two spins , the terms in the density operator (ignoring the identity on its own) can be interpreted as representing

  - longitudinal magnetisation
  - in-phase transverse magnetisation, which is the observable quantity in NMR.
  - anti-phase longitudinal magnetisation
  - longitudinal two-spin order
  - other coherences, which are more difficult to interpret, but may evolve into other terms

The factors of two in the 'true' two-spin operators are to allow for convenient commutation relations in this specific spin-1/2 case - see below. Note also that we could instead choose to expand the density operator in the basis  etc, where the transverse operators have been replaced with raising and lowering operators. With quadrature detection, the observable associated with an individual spin is effectively the non-Hermitian , so this is sometimes more convenient.

Evolution of the density operator 
Consider operators  that obey the cyclic commutation relations

In fact only the first two relations are necessary for the following derivation, but since we are usually working with operators associated with Cartesian directions, such as the individual angular momentum operators, the third commutator follows by a symmetry argument.

Introduce also the commutation superoperator  of an operator  (in our case, this is more formally related to the adjoint representation of the Lie algebra whose elements are ), which acts as

In particular, for the cyclic operators, we have

and consequently for integer 

An identity for two operators  is

In particular, for some scalar parameter , we have

where the final equality follows from recognising the Taylor series for sine and cosine. Using the results above, the density operator at some later time  will be given by

The interpretation of this is that although nuclear spin angular momentum itself is not connected to rotations in three-dimensional space in the same way that angular momentum is, the evolution of the density operator can be viewed as rotations in an abstract space, in which the operators  are the generators of rotations about the axes. An example of such a set of generators is just the spin operators  themselves.

We now also introduce the 'arrow notation' typically used in NMR, which writes the general evolution given above as the shorthand
.
When there is no ambiguity, the arrow label may be omitted, or be eg text instead.

Note that a more complicated calculation has now been reduced to a simpler procedure that requires no knowledge of the underlying quantum mechanics, especially since the subspaces of cyclic operators can be tabulated in advance.

Examples

The 180°-refocussing pulse 
The Hamiltonian for a single spin  evolving under a chemical shift of angular frequency  is

which means that in an ensemble of many such spins with slightly different chemical shifts, there is a dephasing of the magnetisation in the - plane. Consider the pulse sequence
 —  —  — 
where  is a time interval. Starting in an equilibrium state with all the polarisation along the -axis, the evolution of an individual spin in the ensemble is

Hence this sequence refocuses the transverse magnetisation produced by the first pulse, independent of the value of the chemical shift.

As an indication of the utility of the formalism, suppose instead that we tried to reach the same result using states only and therefore the Schrödinger time evolution operators.

Essentially we want to find the propagator in the form , that is as a single exponential of a combination of operators, because that gives the effective Hamiltonian acting during the sequence. Since the arguments of the exponentials in the original form of the propagator do not commute, this amounts to solving a specific example of the Baker–Campbell–Hausdorff (BCH) problem. In this relatively simple case we can solve the BCH problem using the fact that  for unitary operator , operator  and function , as well as the mathematical similarity of the spin operators with the physical rotation generators, which allow us to write

Hence  and only the effect of the 180° pulse remains, which agrees with the product operator treatment. For larger sequences of pulses this state treatment quickly becomes even more unwieldy, unless more advanced methods such as exact effective Hamiltonian theory (which gives closed-form expressions for the entangled propagators via the Cayley-Hamilton theorem and eigendecompositions) are used.

The amplitude of a Hahn echo in an inhomogeneous magnetic field 
 —  —  — 
where again  is a time interval. Liberally dropping irrelevant terms, the evolution for a single spin with offset  up to just after the second pulse is

Now consider an ensemble of spins in a magnetic field that is sufficiently inhomogeneous to completely dephase the spins in the interval between the pulses. After the second pulse, we can decompose the remaining terms into a sum of two spin populations differing only in the sign of the  term, in the sense that for an individual spin we have

Therefore, remembering to include the  introduced by the first pulse, the amplitude of the resulting Hahn echo relative to that produced by an ideal 90°—180° refocussing pulse sequence is roughly

Note that this is not an exact result, because it considers only the refocussing of polarisation that was transverse immediately before the second pulse. In reality there will be further transverse components originating from the tipping of the longitudinal magnetisation that remained after the first pulse. However, for many tip angles, this is a good rule of thumb.

To instead arrive at this result using the state formalism, we would have had to non-trivially evaluate the rotation propagator as

and then evaluate a transition probability by considering the result of applying this to a state representing polarisation in the transverse plane.

DEPT (Distortionless Enhancement by Polarisation Transfer) 
DEPT (Distortionless Enhancement by Polarisation Transfer) is a pulse sequence used to distinguish between the multiplicity of hydrogen bonded to carbon, that is it can separate C, CH, CH2 and CH3 groups. It does this by exploiting the heteronuclear carbon-hydrogen -coupling and varying the tip angle of the final pulse in the sequence. The basic pulse sequence is shown below.

Under the weak coupling assumption, the chemical shift terms commute with the -coupling term in the Hamiltonian. The pulse separation time  is adjusted to the coupling strength  (with associated Hamiltonian coefficient ) such that it satisfies
,
because then the first term in the evolved density operator in Equation  vanishes under the pure coupling evolution between the pulses.

CH 
For illustrative purposes, we assume that the equilibrium state only has polarisation on the -spin (in reality, there will also be polarisation on the  spin, with the relative populations determined by the thermal Boltzmann factors). The -coupling Hamiltonian is

which gives the following evolution

and consequently the next cyclic rotation

Note also that the  term is invariant under the -coupling evolution. That is that the term commutes with the Hamiltonian, and in this case, that can be manually confirmed by evaluating the commutator  using the matrix representations of the spin operators.

CH2 
The -coupling Hamiltonian is now

which gives the following evolution

where 'others' denotes various terms that can safely be ignored because they will not evolve into observable transverse polarisation on the target spin . The required cyclic commutators for dealing with the -coupling evolution are the following three sets (and their  versions if needed)

CH3 

APT (Attached Proton Test) 

APT is similar to DEPT in that it detects carbon multiplicity. However, it has additional degeneracies: it gives identical positive signals for C and CH2, and identical negative signals for CH and CH3. One variation on the basic pulse sequence is shown below.

The key observation is that since we can again ignore the refocussed chemical shift, the only relevant dynamics occur in the interval with no hydrogen decoupling, where we can consider solely the -coupling. The Hamiltonians for the couplings to each of the  separate neighbouring hydrogen atoms commute, so the overall effect is to multiply by a factor . This motivates the alternating sign of the signal mentioned above.

References 

 
 
 
 

Nuclear magnetic resonance